Chan Hao-ching and Chan Yung-jan were the defending champions, but only Hao-ching chose to participate that year.

Hao-ching played with Makoto Ninomiya, but lost in the semifinals to Chan Chin-wei and Han Xinyun.

Liu Wanting and Sun Shengnan won the title, defeating Chan Chin-wei and Han Xinyun 5–7, 6–0, [10–7] in the final.

Seeds

Draw

Draw

References
 Main Draw

Beijing International Challenger - Women's Doubles
2012 Women's Doubles